Blondie is the nickname of:

 Blondie Chaplin (born 1951), South African singer, songwriter and musician, briefly part of the Beach Boys
 Dave Colclough (born 1964), Welsh poker player nicknamed "El Blondie"
 Blondie Forbes, American poker player credited with inventing Texas Hold'em
 Herbert Hasler (1914–1987), British Royal Marine lieutenant colonel during the Second World War
 Blondie Robinson, American stage performer, vaudeville and minstrel.
 Arnold Walker (RAF officer) (1917–2008), British Second World War fighter pilot

 Clint Eastwood's character in The Good, the Bad and the Ugly

See also
 
 
 Oscar Ramírez (born 1964), Costa Rican footballer nicknamed "El Machillo" ("The Blondie")
 Blondy (disambiguation)

Lists of people by nickname